The 2009 UNAF Women's Club Tournament is the 3rd edition of the UNAF Women's Club Tournament. The clubs from Algeria, Egypt, Morocco and Tunisia faced off for the title. The tunisian team ASF Sahel wins the tournament.

Teams

Tournament
The competition played in a round-robin tournament determined the final standings. It's hosted in Suez, Egypt.

References

External links
الجمعية النسائية بالساحل تتوج ببطولة شمال إفريقيا - El Sabah

UNAF Women's Club Tournament
2009 in African football